The Mount Zion A.M.E. Church is a historic church in Ocala, Florida, United States. It is located at 623 South Magnolia Avenue. The only surviving brick 19th-century religious structure in Ocala, the present Gothic Revival church stands behind the site of the original white frame building. Construction of the first brick church owned by a black congregation began in 1891 under the supervision of black architect and builder Levi Alexander, Sr.

On December 17, 1979, it was added to the U.S. National Register of Historic Places.

References

External links
 Marion County listings at National Register of Historic Places
 Marion County listings at Florida's Office of Cultural and Historical Programs

Buildings and structures in Ocala, Florida
National Register of Historic Places in Marion County, Florida
Churches on the National Register of Historic Places in Florida
African Methodist Episcopal churches in Florida
Churches in Marion County, Florida
1891 establishments in Florida
Churches completed in 1891